Bochatay is a surname. Notable people with the surname include:

 Anne Bochatay (born 1968), Swiss ski mountaineer
 Fernande Bochatay (born 1946), Swiss alpine skier
 Jean Bochatay (born 1969), French ice hockey player
 Madeleine Bochatay, French alpine skier
 Nicolas Bochatay, Swiss speed skier